The Bassin de l'Arsenal (also known as the Port de l'Arsenal) is a boat basin in Paris. It links the Canal Saint-Martin, which begins at the Place de la Bastille, to the Seine, at the Quai de la Rapée.  A component of the Réseau des Canaux Parisiens (Parisian Canal Network), it forms part of the boundary between the 4th and the 12th arrondissements.  It is bordered by the Boulevard Bourdon on the 4th (westerly) side and the Boulevard de la Bastille on the 12th (easterly) side.

From the 16th century until the 19th, an arsenal existed at this location.  The arsenal accounts for the name of the basin and the name of the neighborhood, Arsenal, bordering the westerly (4th arrondissement) side of the basin.

After the destruction of the Bastille fortress in November 1789 (during the French Revolution), the Bassin de l'Arsenal was excavated to replace the ditch that had been in place to draw water from the Seine to fill the moat at the fortress.

During the nineteenth century and most of the twentieth, the Bassin de l'Arsenal was a commercial port where goods were loaded and unloaded. Separated from the Seine by the Morland lockgate, the port was converted into a leisure port in 1983 by a decision of the Mairie de Paris (Paris City Hall) and the Chamber of Commerce and Industry, and it is now run by the Association for the Leisure Port of Paris-Arsenal.

The basin is part of France's national Voies navigables de France (VNF, Navigable Waterways of France) system. Since that time, it has been a marina (in French, a port de plaisance), for approximately 180 pleasure boats.

Metro stations
The Bassin de l'Arsenal is located between the Paris Métro stations Quai de la Rapée and Bastille (except the Line 1 platforms, which crosses over the Bassin), and is a short walk from Sully – Morland (Paris Métro).

See also
 Bassin de la Villette
 Canal de l'Ourcq
 Canal Saint-Denis
 Canal Saint-Martin
 Place de la Bastille
 Pavillon de l'Arsenal: Created in 1988, the Pavillon is a center for information, documentation, and expositions concerning urban planning and architecture.
 Caserne des Célestins of the Garde Républicaine: The ceremonial unit of the French Gendarmerie.
 Pont de Sully: The closest bridge across the Seine.
 Square Henri Galli: Contains vestiges of the Bastille fortress.
 Bibliothèque nationale de France: An important branch of the great library, one frequented by Victor Hugo, is near the boat basin.
 Prefecture de Police: Part of the French National Police, which provides the police force for the city of Paris and the surrounding three départements (Hauts-de-Seine, Seine-Saint-Denis, and Val-de-Marne.)
 Opéra Bastille: A modern opera house, it is the home of the Opéra National de Paris.
 Quinze-Vingts Hospital: The National Hospital Center for Ophthalmology (CHNO).
 Institut de la Vision (Paris): Associated with the CHNO.
 La Poste: The main post office of Paris is nearby.
 Lycée Professionnel Chennevières Malezieux: At 33 Avenue Ledru-Rollin.

References

Buildings and structures in the 4th arrondissement of Paris
Buildings and structures in the 12th arrondissement of Paris
Arsenal
Geography of Paris
Transport in Paris
Marinas in France